Baden Wardlaw (born in New Zealand) is a New Zealand rugby union player who plays for the  in Super Rugby. His playing position is flanker. He has signed for the Blues squad in 2020.

He made the Blues for 2020 after a stunning provincial season but was forced to retire in November 2019 after receiving medical advice and can never play rugby again. He was replaced by his Bay of Plenty teammate Aaron Carroll.

Reference list

External links
itsrugby.co.uk profile

New Zealand rugby union players
Living people
Rugby union flankers
Year of birth missing (living people)